Antonio da Sangallo the Younger (12 April 14843 August 1546), also known as Antonio da San Gallo, was an Italian architect active during the  Renaissance, mainly in Rome and the Papal States. One of his most popular projects that he worked on designing is St. Peter’s basilica in the Vatican City. He was also an engineer who worked on restoring several buildings. Sangallo died in Terni, Italy, and was buried in St. Peter’s Basilica.

Early life and apprenticeship
Sangallo was born Antonio Cordiani in Florence, the son of Bartolomeo Piccioni. His grandfather Francesco Giamberti was a woodworker, and his uncles Giuliano and Antonio da Sangallo were noted architects of the time.  Vasari writes that the young Sangallo followed his uncles to Rome in order to pursue a career in architecture; he ended up taking the name ″Sangallo″ in their tracks.  Instead of becoming an apprentice to an artist, as was the common path toward becoming an architect, Sangallo apprenticed to a carpenter; nevertheless he quickly became an apprentice under Donato Bramante.

As an assistant to Bramante, Sangallo prepared a number of sketches due to the disability of his master and was recognized for his talent and attention to detail as a draftsman.  Due to his success, Bramante gave Sangallo a number of projects to complete with no more than an outline of the design and motifs.  Eventually, Sangallo was put in charge of the Passetto di Borgo between the Papal apartments and the Castel Sant'Angelo.  That particular project was left unfinished, but it left Sangallo with a working reputation as an architect.

Independent commissions
Now living in Rome, Sangallo quickly received a major commission for the church of  Santa Maria di Loreto in 1507. His design called for a square first story and an octagonal second story built in travertine and brick; the dome and lantern were finished many years later.  Sangallo also drew the attention of the Cardinal Alessandro Farnese (who would later become the Pope Paul III), from whom he received a number of commissions.  First and foremost of these is the Farnese Palace on the Piazza Farnese, although it was not completed until after his death.  Sangallo also received a number of further contracts from the Farnese family.  For instance, he designed a palace (since destroyed) and the Church of Santa Maria Maddalena in the Farnese town of Gradoli.  He also designed fortifications for Capo di Monte and Caprarola; the latter eventually became a country estate, the Villa Farnese.

In addition to the Farnese family, Sangallo had a number of patrons in Rome.  He designed the Palazzo Baldassini near the Basilica of Sant'Agostino for Melchiore Baldassini; he designed a tomb for the Cardinal Jaume Serra i Cau in San Giacomo degli Spagnoli.  Sangallo was also one of several artists hired to design the Villa Madama by Cardinal Giulio de' Medici, the future  Clement VII; he was personally responsible for the final design of the building itself.  Through these projects, Sangallo acquired the reputation of a master architect in the city of Rome; when Bramante died in 1514, Sangallo, along with Raphael and Giovanni Giocondo, was appointed to oversee the construction of St. Peter's Basilica by Pope Leo X.  Sangallo was hired extensively by Leo X, not only as an architect, but also as an engineer tasked to restore and save a number of buildings.

Engineering feats
Sometime later, Sangallo was hired to build the foundation for the church of San Giovanni dei Fiorentini on the bank of the Tiber.  Jacopo Sansovino's design called for the church to extend into the river, a difficult task given the unstable bank.  Sangallo successfully completed the foundation, although at such great expense that there was no longer enough money to build the church.  Thus the model that Sangallo designed for the church was not built, and construction to the designs of Giacomo della Porta was not begun until 1583.

Another project was the Basilica della Santa Casa in Loreto.  The church had not been built particularly well, with cracking vaults and an unstable foundation.  Sangallo redesigned the church and shored up the foundations; Vasari claims the church to be ″the best that Antonio ever executed″ despite the challenges innate in rebuilding a church as opposed to building a new one from the ground up.  Sangallo was also hired to do similar work on the Vatican loggias, which had shown signs of weakness due to poor construction; his reinforcements stand today.

Sangallo was also a noted military architect, working on the fortifications of numerous cities such as Parma, Piacenza, Ancona and Orvieto.  In Orvieto, he was also tasked by Pope Clement VII with building a well, called Saint Patrick's Well, noted as a marvel of engineering.  Its double-helix ramps around a central open shaft allowed oxen carrying water to go down via one of the ramps and up via the other without having to turn around; despite its 175-foot depth, the ramps are well lit through windows cut into the centre section.  Possibly an inspiration for the design was the Well of Joseph in the Cairo Citadel, also featuring a double spiral staircase.

His last project was the draining of the Rieti Valley, which had been commissioned to him by Pope Paul III; in the insalubrious marshy environment, Sangallo contracted malaria and died before finishing his work.

Work on the Vatican and Saint Peter's Basilica
Sangallo had maintained a good relationship with the popes, and thus was constantly involved in the designing and building process of St. Peter's Basilica from 1513 until at least 1536.  As "capomaestro", he was in charge of the day-to-day construction of the basilica for many years.  He also created a design for the basilica, of which a wooden model exists today.

Sangallo also worked extensively on the Vatican apartments, building the Pauline Chapel, the Sala Regia which serves as the entryway to the Sistine Chapel, and the Scala Regia, the staircase that serves as the main entrance to the Apostolic Palace.  Vasari also claims that Sangallo modified the Sistine Chapel by elevating the roof, although exactly what the modifications are is unclear.

Selected works
 Basilica della Santa Casa in Loreto.
 Cappella Paolina, the Sala Regia and the Scala Regia in the Vatican.
 Old Fortress, Livorno.
 Palazzo Baldassini in Rome.
 Palazzo del Governatore di Borgo in Rome, demolished in 1936.
 Palazzo Farnese in Rome (1534–46), designed for Cardinal Alessandro Farnese.
 Palazzo Sacchetti on the Via Giulia in Rome; designed by Sangallo for himself.
 Saint Patrick's Well in Orvieto.
 Santa Maria di Loreto in Rome.
 San Giovanni dei Fiorentini in Rome.
 St. Peter's Basilica in Rome (chief architect from 1520 on).
 Villa Madama in Rome (started 1518).
 Cappella Paolina, the Sala Regia and the Scala Regia in the Vatican.

Death and legacy
Sangallo had begun the design for the Palazzo Farnese in 1513; when Cardinal Alessandro Farnese became Pope Paul III in 1534, the design was expanded into its current size.  According to Sir Banister Fletcher, it is "the most imposing Italian palace of the 16th Century."  In 1546, during the construction, Paul III became dissatisfied with the design for the cornice, and held a competition for a new cornice design. Michelangelo won the competition and oversaw the completion of the palace; Sangallo reportedly died, in Terni, Italy, from shame not long after.  He is buried in St. Peter's Basilica with the following epitaph:

     ANTONIO SANCTI GALLI FLORENTINO, URBE MUNIENDA AC PUB.
OPERIBUS, PRAECIPUEQUE D. PETRI TEMPLO ORNAN. ARCHITECTORUM
FACILE PRINCIPI, DUM VELINI LACUS EMISSIONEM PARAT, PAULO PONT.
MAX. AUCTORE, INTERAMNAE INTEMPESTIVE EXTINCTO ISABELLA DETA
UXOR MOESTISS.  POSUIT 1546, III. CALEND. OCTOBRIS.

His biographer Vasari writes, ″In truth Antonio, who was a most excellent architect, deserves to be celebrated and extolled, as his works clearly demonstrate, no less than any other architect, whether ancient or modern.″

References

External links
 Antonio da Sangallo the Younger in the "History in Art"
 RIBA Library: news release 3 May 2005 concerning the Codes Stosch"
 

1484 births
1546 deaths
Architects from Florence
16th-century Italian architects